Joshua Zak (born 1929) is an Israeli theoretical physicist and writer known for the Zak transform, Zak phase and the Magnetic Translation Group. He received the 2022 Israel prize and 2014 Wigner medal.

Most cited publications
Zak J. Berry's phase for energy bands in solids. Physical Review Letters. 1989 Jun 5;62(23):2747. 
 J. Zak.  Magnetic translation group. Physical Review. 1964 Jun 15;134(6A):A1602.  
Zak J, Moog ER, Liu C, Bader SD. Universal approach to magneto-optics. Journal of Magnetism and Magnetic Materials. 1990 Sep 1;89(1-2):107-23   
Zak J, Moog ER, Liu C, Bader SD. Magneto-optics of multilayers with arbitrary magnetization directions. Physical Review B. 1991 Mar 15;43(8):6423.  
Zak J. Finite translations in solid-state physics. Physical Review Letters. 1967 Dec 11;19(24):1385.

Honors and awards 

 Wigner Medal 2014
 Israel prize, for his achievements in physics, in 2022.
 The Brown-Zak fermion and the Zak transform are called after his name.

Website 
https://phsites.technion.ac.il/zak/

References 

Living people
1929 births
Israeli physicists